Pilhatsch is a surname. Notable people with the surname include:

Alexander Pilhatsch (born 1963), Austrian swimmer
Arnulf Pilhatsch (1925–2000), Austrian high jumper
Caroline Pilhatsch (born 1999), Austrian swimmer